The spiny-fingered horned toad (Boulenophrys spinata) or spiny spadefoot toad, is a species of frog in the family Megophryidae. It is endemic to China and known from Sichuan, Yunnan, Guizhou, and Guangxi provinces. Its natural habitats are subtropical or tropical moist lowland forests, subtropical or tropical moist montane forests, and rivers.
It is threatened by habitat loss.

Males measure  and females  in length.

References

Boulenophrys
Amphibians of China
Endemic fauna of China
Taxonomy articles created by Polbot
Amphibians described in 1973